The 2014 French Figure Skating Championships took place between 12 and 15 December 2013 in Vaujany. Medals were awarded in the disciplines of men's singles, ladies' singles, pair skating, ice dancing, and synchronized skating on the senior level. The results were among the criteria – along with FFSG minimum scores and jump requirements – used to choose the French entries for the 2014 Winter Olympics, 2014 World Championships, 2014 European Championship, and 2014 World Synchronized Skating Championships.

Senior results

Men

Ladies

Pairs

Ice dancing

Synchronized

Junior results

Men

Ladies

Ice dancing

Synchronized skating

References

External links
 2013 French Championships at FFSG 
 Starting orders/detailed results 
 Junior results

French Figure Skating Championships
Figure Skating Championships, 2013
2013 in figure skating